The men's singles tennis event at the 2011 Summer Universiade was held from August 14–21 at the Longgang Tennis Center and the Shenzhen Tennis Center in Shenzhen, China.

Seeds
The first four seeds receive a bye into the second round.

Draw

Finals

Top half

Section 1

Section 2

Bottom half

Section 3

Section 4

Consolation draw

Consolation finals

Consolation main draw

Top half

Bottom half

References

Main Draw
Consolation Main Draw

Men's Singles